Sirius is an open-source software project of the Eclipse Foundation. This technology allows users to create custom graphical modeling workbenches by leveraging the Eclipse Modeling technologies, including EMF and GMF. The modeling workbench created is composed of a set of Eclipse editors (diagrams, tables and trees) which allow the users to create, edit and visualize EMF models.

History 
Sirius is the result of a partnership launched in 2007 between Thales and Obeo. The initial goal was to provide a generic workbench for model-based architecture engineering that could be tailored to fit specific needs.

In 2013, the project was released in Open Source under the scope of the Eclipse Foundation. Sirius is integrated into annual release train of the Eclipse platform.

Principles 
Sirius enables the specification of a modeling workbench in terms of graphical, table or tree editors with validation rules and actions using declarative descriptions. All shape characteristics and behaviors can be configured with a minimum technical knowledge. This description is dynamically interpreted to materialize the workbench within the Eclipse IDE. No code generation is involved, the specifier of the workbench can have instant feedback while adapting the description. Once completed, the modeling workbench can be deployed as a standard Eclipse plugin.

Sirius provides a set of customizable and dynamic representations. These representations can be combined and customized according to the concept of Viewpoint, inspired from the ISO/IEC 42010 standard. Views, dedicated to a specific Viewpoint can adapt both their display and behavior depending on the model state and on the current concern. The same information can also be simultaneously represented through diagram, table or tree editors.

From the specifier/developer perspective, Sirius provides:
 The ability to define workbenches providing editors including diagrams, tables or trees.
 The ability to integrate and deploy the aforementioned environment into Eclipse IDE's or RCP applications.
 The ability to customize existing environments by specialization and extension.

From the end user perspective, Sirius provides:
 Rich and specialized modeling editors to design their models.
 Synchronization between these different editors.

Uses 
Sirius is mainly used to design complex systems (industrial systems or IT applications). The first use case was Capella, a Systems Engineering workbench contributed to the Eclipse Working Group PolarSys in 2014 by Thales.

The Sirius gallery on the project website lists some of the projects using Sirius.

Compatibility 

The latest release of Sirius is compatible with the following version of Eclipse:
 Eclipse Oxygen
 Eclipse Neon
 Eclipse 2020-09

Sirius is based on the modeling framework EMF. Thus it is compatible with any tool that can produce EMF compatible models.

Community and communication 
The Sirius community is gathered around the Sirius part of the website of the Eclipse Foundation. The Sirius documentation is accessible online on the Eclipse Help Center and on the wiki of the Sirius project.

Conferences 
Each year the Sirius community meet at SiriusCon. The developers of Sirius are also communicating with the community thanks to presentation realized in Modeling or Eclipse conferences.

References

Further reading 
Articles
Sirius: A rapid development of DSM graphical editor at Intelligent Engineering Systems (INES), 2014
Comparative analysis of DSM Graphical Editor frameworks: Graphiti vs. Sirius at 23rd International Electrotechnical and Computer Science Conference ERK
 Development of DSM Graphical Editor for RESTful Sensor Web Networks Modeling at Applied Computational Intelligence and Informatics (SACI), 2014

External links

 

Eclipse (software)